The Barid Shahi tombs are tombs of the Barid Shahi dynasty. They are located in Bidar in the Indian state of Karnataka.

History
They were built during the medieval period in the 16th and 17th centuries.

Architecture
The tombs were built in the Indo-Islamic style typical of the Deccan Sultanates. Similar necropolises include the Qutb Shahi tombs in Hyderabad. They are set in a garden, of which a few mango and tamarind trees still survive. There is an idgah at the eastern end of Qasim Barid's tomb.

Tomb of Qasim Barid
The Tomb of Qasim Barid lies to the East of his son Amir Barid's unfinished tomb.

Tomb of Amir Barid
Amir Barid lies in an unfinished tomb. He began the construction of his tomb, however, he died in 1542 CE before the tomb could be completed.

Tomb of Ali Barid
The tomb of Ali Barid was completed in 984 Hijri (1576-1577 CE), three years before his death.

Tomb of Ibrahim Barid
The tomb of Ibrahim Barid is a replica of his father Ali Barid's tomb.

Tomb of Qasim Barid II 
The tomb is to the south of Ibrahim Barid's tomb.

See also
Chahartaq (architecture)

References

Citations

Bibliography 
  
 

Bidar
Tombs in Karnataka